The 2012 NBA playoffs was the postseason tournament of the National Basketball Association's 2011–12 season. The tournament concluded with the Eastern Conference champion Miami Heat defeating the Western Conference champion Oklahoma City Thunder 4 games to 1 in the NBA Finals. LeBron James was named NBA Finals MVP.

Overview

Western Conference
The Los Angeles Clippers made the playoffs for the first time since 2006, while the Utah Jazz returned after a one-year hiatus. It was also Utah’s first postseason appearance without Jerry Sloan as head coach since 1988. Ironically, both teams would be swept by the San Antonio Spurs.

The San Antonio Spurs entered their fifteenth consecutive postseason, continuing the longest active playoff streak at the time. 

The defending champion Dallas Mavericks entered their twelfth consecutive postseason, the second longest active playoff streak in the Western Conference.

The Memphis Grizzlies earned home-court advantage for the first time in franchise history.

Eastern Conference
All eight teams were the same from 2011. They also all had records over .500, the first time since 2005.

The Orlando Magic entered their sixth consecutive postseason, the longest active postseason streak in the eastern conference at the time. Their in-state rivals, the Miami Heat entered their fourth consecutive postseason. The Magic and Heat gained notoriety for opening their postseason runs against the Pacers and Knicks despite recent tragedies rocking their respective cities. The Orlando Magic opened their NBA Playoffs against the Indiana Pacers just 2 months after the killing of Trayvon Martin in nearby Sanford, Florida, just 30 miles from where they play their games at Amway Center. Meanwhile, the Miami Heat opened their NBA Playoffs against the New York Knicks just 15 days after a drunk driver caused a devastating crash in southwest Miami-Dade County, just 23 miles from where they play their games at American Airlines Arena.

The Indiana Pacers opened the playoffs at home for the first time since 2004. 

The New York Knicks and Philadelphia 76ers entered their second consecutive postseason.

First Round
For the first time since 2000, the Miami Heat and the New York Knicks met in the postseason, reigniting the Heat-Knicks rivalry.

For the fourth time since 2006, a division winner (in this case the Atlantic Division champion Boston Celtics) opened the playoffs on the road. Despite not having home court advantage, the Boston Celtics beat the Atlanta Hawks in six games. The Hawks would not open the playoffs at home again until 2015.

Game 1 of the Bulls-Sixers series was extremely notable as Derrick Rose tore his ACL in the waning minutes of the Bulls’ 103-91 victory.

With their Game 3 loss to the Miami Heat, the New York Knicks lost their 13th straight playoff game, breaking Memphis' record from 2004–06 for the longest playoff losing streak. However, they broke that streak with a Game 4 victory against The Heat at Madison Square Garden.

With their Game 4 loss to the Oklahoma City Thunder, the defending champions Dallas Mavericks were swept in the first round, becoming the third defending champion to be swept in the First Round after the Philadelphia Warriors in 1957 and Miami Heat in 2007, and second after Miami to be done so in a seven game series. It was the first time the Mavericks were swept in a seven game series, and only their second sweep since 1990.

With their Game 5 win against the New York Knicks, the Miami Heat beat their arch rivals in a playoff series for the first time since 1997. During the series, however, the Knicks lost Baron Davis and Iman Shumpert to knee injuries.

With their Game 5 win against the Orlando Magic, the Indiana Pacers won their first playoff series since 2005. The Magic would not return to the postseason until 2019.

With their Game 6 win over the Chicago Bulls, the eighth-seeded Philadelphia 76ers became only the 5th eighth seeded team in NBA history to beat a top seed in the first round. Following the Grizzlies' 2011 upset of the 1st-seeded Spurs, this marked the first time in straight seasons an 8th-seed upset a #1 seed. In addition to losing Rose, the Bulls also lost Joakim Noah to injury during the series. As of 2023, this was the most recent occurrence of an eighth seed eliminating a top seed in the first round of the playoffs.

Game 7 of the Lakers–Nuggets series ensured a 13th straight postseason with at least one Game 7 played. The last without one was the 1999 NBA playoffs.

With their Game 7 win over the Memphis Grizzlies, the Los Angeles Clippers won their first playoff series since 2006.

Conference Semifinals
During their conference semifinals series against the Indiana Pacers, the Miami Heat lost Chris Bosh to injury (although he would return in Game 5 of the Eastern Conference Finals). As a result, the Heat fell behind two games to one before reeling off three straight wins to beat the Pacers in six games.

For the first time since 1999, back to backs were played in the conference semifinals, thanks to the Los Angeles Lakers and the Los Angeles Clippers sharing the same arena to avoid scheduling conflicts. It also marked the first time both Los Angeles teams appeared in the Conference Semifinals in the same season. As of 2023, this was the most recent occurrence of back to backs being played in the same postseason.

With their Game 4 win over the Los Angeles Clippers, the San Antonio Spurs became the fourth team in NBA History (and first in the Western Conference) to go 8-0 through the first two rounds of the playoffs. The Heat in 2005, Cavs in 2009 and Magic in 2010, also went 8–0 through the first two rounds. In addition, all 3 lost Game 1 of their Conference Finals. The Spurs broke this trend with a Game 1 win over the Oklahoma City Thunder in the Western Conference Finals.

Game 5 of the Lakers-Thunder series was Kobe Bryant’s final NBA playoff game. In addition, this was also his final NBA Playoff appearance before his retirement in 2016.

With their Game 7 win over the Philadelphia 76ers, the Boston Celtics returned to the Conference Finals for the third time in five seasons. With the loss, the Philadelphia 76ers suffered the same fate as last season’s Memphis Grizzlies by beating a top seed, taking their fourth seed opponent to a Game 7, only to lose on the road. The 76ers would not return to the playoffs until 2018.

Conference Finals
For the third consecutive season, the Miami Heat and the Boston Celtics met in the postseason.

With their Game 2 win over the Oklahoma City Thunder, the San Antonio Spurs won 20 straight games. As a result, they set an NBA record for the longest winning streak carried over from the regular season to the playoffs, which was broken with the Game 3 loss, and finished a win short of tying the longest unbeaten playoff run in a single postseason. 

Game 5 of the Heat-Celtics series was notable for the return of Chris Bosh and the Boston Celtics overcoming a 2-0 series deficit to take a 3-2 lead going back to Boston. However, the Miami Heat would force a Game 7 thanks to LeBron James’ 45 point Game 6 performance in the Miami Heat’s 98-79 win at TD Garden.

With a Game 6 win over the San Antonio Spurs, the Oklahoma City Thunder returned to the NBA Finals for the first time since 1996 (when they were known as the Seattle SuperSonics). The Spurs, on the other hand, lost the series 4–2 despite leading 2–0.

With a Game 7 win over the Boston Celtics, the Miami Heat returned to the NBA Finals for the second straight season. It marked the first time a LeBron James-led team beat the Boston Celtics in a playoff series despite trailing 3-2. With the loss, this was the second time that the Celtics lost a playoff series despite leading 3-2. The Celtics would not win another playoff series, let alone return to the conference finals, until 2017.

Game 7 of the Eastern Conference Finals was Ray Allen’s last game as a member of the Boston Celtics, effectively ending their “Big 3 era,” which began in 2007.

NBA Finals
The 2012 NBA Finals were notable for several reasons.

For the first time since 1998, no team from California or Texas represented the western conference in the NBA Finals. Ironically, the Oklahoma City Thunder eliminated the last three Western Conference finalists: the Dallas Mavericks, the Los Angeles Lakers, and the San Antonio Spurs, all in sequential order.

For the first time in franchise history, the Miami Heat faced a team other than the Dallas Mavericks in the NBA Finals.

Game 1 of the 2012 NBA Finals was the first NBA Finals game ever played in the State of Oklahoma. The Thunder won this game 105-94.

With a Game 5 win over the Oklahoma City Thunder, the Miami Heat won their second NBA championship. By winning the 2012 NBA Finals, the Heat became the second team to win the NBA Finals by overcoming three series deficits (2-1 in the conference semifinals, 3-2 in the conference finals, and 0-1 in the finals) in the same playoffs. The last team to accomplish this feat was the 1995 Houston Rockets. It was also the third (and final time) under the 2-3-2 format that the home team won the middle three games of the NBA Finals.

Connection with NBA Lockout
In May 2012, with the Bulls, Knicks, and Heat losing players to injuries, then-Commissioner David Stern initially said there was no connection between the injuries and the lockout that compressed the regular season to 66-game in 124 days; however, he later backed off those comments, saying more research was needed.

Format

The 6 division winners and 10 other teams with the most wins from each conference qualified for the playoffs. The seedings are based on each team's record; however, a division winner is guaranteed to be ranked at least fourth, regardless of record.

Tiebreak procedures
The tiebreakers that determine seedings are:
Division leader wins tie from team not leading a division
Head-to-head record
Division record (if all the tied teams are in the same division)
Conference record
Record vs. playoff teams, own conference
Record vs. playoff teams, other conference (only in 2-way tie)
Point differential, all games

If there were more than two teams tied, the team that wins the tiebreaker gets the highest seed, while the other teams were "re-broken" from the first step until all ties were resolved. Since the three division winners were guaranteed a spot in the top four, ties to determine the division winners had to be broken before any other ties.

Playoff qualifying

Eastern Conference

— = Did not achieve

Western Conference

— = Did not achieve

Notes

Bracket
Teams in bold advanced to the next round. The numbers to the left of each team indicate the team's seeding in its conference, and the numbers to the right indicate the number of games the team won in that round. The division champions are marked by an asterisk. Home court advantage belongs to the team with the better regular season record, regardless of seed. (If two teams with the same record meet in a round, the tiebreakers used are head-to-head and record vs. opposite conference.)  Teams with home court advantage are shown in italics in the chart below.

First round
All times are in Eastern Daylight Time (UTC−4)

Eastern Conference first round

(1) Chicago Bulls vs. (8) Philadelphia 76ers

The Bulls came into the playoffs as the first overall seed for the second straight year. The 76ers, meanwhile, came into the playoffs as the team with the worst record in the playoffs. The Bulls made quick work of the 76ers, winning Game 1. However, with the Bulls leading by 12 with 1:20 to go in the fourth, Derrick Rose tore his ACL and he was ruled out for the playoffs, putting the Bulls championship hopes in serious jeopardy. The 76ers took the next three games to put the Bulls in the brink of elimination. In Game 3, Joakim Noah was injured when he stepped on Andre Iguodala's foot, ruling him out for the next two games. The Bulls staved off elimination by winning Game 5 at home. In Game 6, with the Bulls up 1 with 7 seconds to go, Ömer Aşık missed two crucial free-throws. Iguodala managed to rebound the ball and sprinted to the other side of the court. He got fouled by Aşık while going for a shot. Iguodala gave the 76ers the lead by making the free-throws. The Bulls, who were out of timeouts, had one last chance to force a Game 7 but C. J. Watson's halfcourt heave bounced off the back of the rim, giving the 76ers the series. They advanced to the semifinals for the first time since 2003. The Bulls, meanwhile, became the fifth first-seeded team to be upset by the eighth-seed.

Regular-season series

This was the third playoff meeting between these two teams, with the Bulls winning the first two meetings.

(2) Miami Heat vs. (7) New York Knicks

The Heat defeated the Knicks in Game 1 by 33 points. Game 2 was much closer, even without Knicks' starting rookie guard Iman Shumpert who suffered an ACL injury the previous game, but the Heat still won by 10. In Game 3 in MSG, the Heat found themselves on the wrong end in the first half, trailing by as much as 11 points, before closing the half with a 7–0 run. The Heat led by 2 after the 3rd quarter. However, LeBron James quickly sparked an 8–0 run to start the 4th quarter, giving them a 10-point lead. The Knicks never recovered. James himself outscored the Knicks in the fourth, 17–14. By losing Game 3, the Knicks set a new league record by losing 13 straight playoff games, their last win coming April 29, 2001, in their series versus the Raptors. In Game 4, Knicks' starting guard Baron Davis injured himself in the third quarter and had to be carried off the court on a stretcher. But led by Carmelo Anthony's 41, the Knicks won 89–87, escaping a sweep as Wade's potential series-winning 3 missed at the buzzer. In Game 5, the Knicks started strong but Miami took over the rest of the way. The Heat led by 11 at the end of the first half. The Heat never squandered the lead, effectively sealing the game and the series with a 3-pointer by Battier that gave the Heat a 14-point lead with a minute left in the game. The Knicks were led by Anthony's 35. Amar'e Stoudemire, meanwhile, was plagued by foul trouble. He fouled out with about 4 minutes left in the game.

Regular-season series

This was the fifth playoff meeting between these two teams, with the Knicks winning three of the first four meetings.

(3) Indiana Pacers vs. (6) Orlando Magic

The Pacers were considered the heavy favorites in the series as the Magic would try to defeat the Pacers without Dwight Howard. The Magic defied the odds in Game 1, as the Pacers went scoreless in the final 4 minutes of the game, allowing the Magic to go on an 11–0 run to finish the game and take a 1–0 series lead. The Pacers quickly took revenge, winning the next two games at home and on the road by an average of 19 points. Game 4 was close, with the game going to overtime. However, George Hill hit two free-throws with 2 seconds left to give the Pacers a 3–1 lead in the series. Game 5 was close throughout the first three quarters, with Magic taking a two-point lead heading to the 4th quarter. However, Indiana outscored the Magic 36–16 in the fourth to give the Pacers the series victory 4–1. This would be last playoff appearance for the Magic until 2019.

Regular-season series

This was the third playoff meeting between these two teams, with each team winning one series apiece.

(4) Boston Celtics vs. (5) Atlanta Hawks

The Hawks had homecourt advantage for the series despite being the lower seeded team by having the better season-record of the two; the Celtics took the 4th-seed by winning their division title. The Hawks won Game 1 by nine points, but the Celtics took the next three games, pushing the Hawks to the brink of elimination. Games 2 and 3 were close victories for the Celtics with Game 4 being a blowout victory for them. Game 5 in Atlanta was a close one. In the final seconds, with the Hawks up by one, Rajon Rondo stole an inbound pass, giving the Celtics a chance to finish off the Hawks. However, Josh Smith stripped a Rondo pass intended for Kevin Garnett, letting the Hawks survive and force a Game 6. In Game 6, Garnett led the Celtics to an 83–80 victory and advance. The Hawks had a chance to tie the game through free throws. However, Al Horford missed his first free throw that could have cut the lead to one. It was the Hawks' only miss at the free throw line the entire night. He made his second to cut it to one and the Hawks quickly fouled Paul Pierce. Pierce made both free throws to extend Celtics' lead to 3. With a chance to tie the game, Jeff Teague fumbled a pass, sealing the series for Boston.

Regular-season series

This was the 11th playoff meeting between these two teams, with the Celtics winning nine of the first ten meetings.

Western Conference first round

(1) San Antonio Spurs vs. (8) Utah Jazz

The Spurs were touted the heavy favorites in the series, following their 10-game winning streak to end the regular season and their 3–1 season series victory over the Jazz. They quickly worked their way through the Jazz, scoring 31 points in the third quarter to blow the game open. They eventually won Game 1 106–91. In Game 2, the Spurs shot 10 three-pointers and shot more than 50% as they blew out the Jazz 114–83 to take a 2–0 series lead. Game 3 was close throughout the first half, with the Spurs leading only by 2 after the first half. However, the Spurs blew the game open in the second half and won by 12 to take a 3–0 lead in the series. The odds were stacked against the Jazz as no team in NBA history have managed to win a series after trailing 3–0. Notably, before Game 4 had even been played, Jazz forward Al Jefferson commented that he didn't think any team would defeat the Spurs In Game 4, it seemed like the Spurs would complete the sweep when they had a 21-point lead. However, the Jazz eventually cut the lead to just 4 with 49.4 seconds left in the fourth. However, Tony Parker and Manu Ginóbili eventually sealed the series by stealing the ball and scoring on a basket respectively. The Spurs eventually completed the sweep, winning Game 4 by 6.

Regular-season series

This was the fifth playoff meeting between these two teams, with the Jazz winning three of the first four meetings.

(2) Oklahoma City Thunder vs. (7) Dallas Mavericks

The Mavericks came into the playoffs only as the 7th-seed, one of the lowest placements for a defending champion. Game 1 was a very close affair, with both teams going back and forth in the final minutes of the fourth quarter. However, Kevin Durant scored on a one-handed jumper with just about 1 second remaining. The Mavs still tried to win but Shawn Marion failed to get a shot off at the buzzer, giving the Thunder a one-point victory and a 1–0 series lead. Game 2 was also a close one but the Thunder held on and managed to squeak a 102–99 win and 2–0 series lead over the defending champs. In Game 3, the Mavs were no match for the Thunder, with the Thunder eventually blowing out the defending champs 95–79 to send the Mavs into the brink of a sweep. In Game 4, it looked as if the Mavs would stave off elimination when they led by 13 at the end of the third quarter. However, the Thunder outscored the Mavs 35–16 in the fourth and held on for a 103–97 victory over the Mavs. Following the sweep, the Mavs became just the 3rd defending champion to be swept in the first round.

Regular-season series

This was the fourth playoff meeting between these two teams, with the Mavericks winning two of the first three meetings.

(3) Los Angeles Lakers vs. (6) Denver Nuggets

The Lakers won the opening game 103–88 after Andrew Bynum had a triple-double with 10 points, 13 rebounds, and 10 blocked shots. The blocked shots broke Kareem Abdul-Jabbar's franchise record of nine, and tied the NBA playoff record set by Mark Eaton and Hakeem Olajuwon. Kobe Bryant scored 31 points and Pau Gasol added 13 points, eight rebounds and eight assists. The Lakers then won a close Game 2 but the Nuggets proceeded to blow out the Lakers in Game 3 99–84 to prevent the Lakers from taking a commanding 3–0 lead. Game 4 was close but Sessions and Blake hit pivotal 3's to put the Lakers in the lead for good and take a 3–1 series lead. Before Game 5, Bynum said that "Close-out games are actually kind of easy." The Nuggets responded by taking Game 5 102–99. The game saw the Lakers erase a 90–75 deficit with 6:35 left in the fourth quarter. In Game 6, Bryant played despite having a stomach illness, but still managed to score 31 points. However, with little contribution from Gasol and Bynum, the Nuggets forced Game 7 with a 113–96 blowout win over the Lakers. The Lakers won the series 4–3, and avoided becoming the ninth team in NBA history to be eliminated after blowing a 3–1 series lead. Gasol had 23 points, 17 rebounds and six assists, Bynum had 16 points and a playoff career-high 18 rebounds, and Steve Blake scored a playoff career-high 19 points in a 96–87 win in Game 7. The Lakers blew a 16-point lead in the second half before Gasol put the Lakers ahead for good with a tip-in basket with 6:30 left. Kobe Bryant sealed Denver's fate by hitting a 3 with 48.3 seconds left to put the Lakers up 8. Denver had 19 turnovers in the game and shot just 7-of-27 in the fourth quarter. Returning from his seven-game suspension, Metta World Peace scored 15 points, while Bryant had 17 points, and 8 assists.

Regular-season series

This was the sixth playoff meeting between these two teams, with the Lakers winning the first five meetings.

(4) Memphis Grizzlies vs. (5) Los Angeles Clippers

The Clippers rallied to win Game 1 in one of the largest comebacks in playoff history. Trailing by as many as 27, and down 95–71 with 9:13 left, the Clippers held the Grizzlies to just one field goal the rest of the game and pulled off an improbable 99–98 victory before a stunned, sold-out crowd of 18,119 at FedExForum. In Game 2, the Grizzlies avenged their embarrassing Game 1 loss by winning a close Game 2 to even the series going to Los Angeles. In Game 3, the Clippers survived a late Grizzlies rally in the final minute as Rudy Gay's 3 missed at the buzzer to give the Clippers an 87–86 victory and a 2–1 series lead. Game 4 was close, with the game going to overtime. With Chris Paul's heroics, the Clippers managed to win Game 4 and take a commanding 3–1 series lead. Back at home for Game 5, the Grizzlies tried to stave off elimination, at one point taking a 24-point lead in the third before the Clippers cut the lead again. However, the Grizzlies made sure there would be no collapse, using a 7–1 run in the final 1:44 to win Game 5 92–80. Facing elimination on the road, the Grizzlies gathered themselves, storming back from an eight-point fourth-quarter deficit to win Game 6 90–88, to force a decisive Game 7. In Game 7, the Clipper bench outscored their Grizzlies counterparts, 41–11, and it was enough as the Clippers won on the road, becoming the 6th NBA road team to do so after leading series 3–1, to advance to the semifinals against the Spurs.

Regular-season series

This was the first playoff meeting between the Clippers and the Grizzlies.

Conference semifinals

Eastern Conference semifinals

(2) Miami Heat vs. (3) Indiana Pacers

Even though the Heat won the regular season series, 3–1, this playoff series was expected to be a close one. In Game 1, the Heat took a major blow when Chris Bosh got injured in the first half. He was expected to be out for the rest of the series. However, James and Wade took over in the second half to give the Heat the win, 95–86. In Game 2, the Heat started strong, at one point taking a 9-point lead. The Pacers answered that by outscoring the Heat 28–14 in the third quarter to take an 11-point lead going to the fourth quarter. The Heat would come back, taking a 72–71 lead with 4:11 to go. However, with James and Wade missing key chances, the Pacers tied the series with a 78–75 win. Game 3 marked one of the worst playoff games for Wade, as he scored just 5 points on 2-of-13 shooting. Without Wade's contribution, the Heat found themselves down in the series 2–1 as the Pacers blew out the Heat, 94–75. Before Game 4, the Heat regrouped and refocused on the series. The result was a 101–93 victory over the Pacers in Game 4 to tie the series at 2–2. James scored 40 in the game, to go along with 18 rebounds and 9 assists. Wade recovered from his Game 3 performance by scoring 30. In Game 5, it was the Pacers who took the major blow when Danny Granger got injured in the second quarter by stepping on James's foot. He tried to come back in the third quarter but he aggravated his injury after fouling James. Then, after the third period, West left the game with a knee injury. Without Granger and West, the Pacers were unable to stop the Heat, as the Heat won 115–83 to take a 3–2 series lead, putting them a win away from the Eastern Conference Finals. In Game 6, West and Granger started for the Pacers despite their injuries. The Pacers started strong, even taking a 19–8 lead in the first quarter. However, the third quarter was decisive, with the Heat outscoring the Pacers 28–16 to take a 79–69 lead going to the fourth quarter. Led by Wade's 41 and James's 28, the Heat won three straight, 105–93, to take the series, 4–2.

Regular-season series

This was the second playoff meeting between these two teams, with the Pacers winning the first meeting.

(4) Boston Celtics vs. (8) Philadelphia 76ers

The Sixers came off fresh of an upset over the injury-laden Bulls. Both the Celtics and the Sixers clinched their first round series on the same day. In Game 1, Rondo had another triple-double, but the Sixers held a 10-point lead with 10:53 left in the fourth quarter. However, the Celtics eventually came back, winning Game 1 by a point to take a 1–0 series lead. On the final possession, the Sixers were unable to foul a speedy Rondo, who dribbled out the clock.  Game 2 saw the visitors lead for most of the game. With the Sixers leading 78–75 with 12 seconds to go, the Celtics squandered a chance to tie the game, as Garnett was called for an offensive foul. The Sixers then hit their final four free-throws to tie the series at 1 going back to Philadelphia. In Game 3, the Sixers held their last lead with 9:09 left in the second quarter as the Celtics took over the rest of the game to lead them to a 2–1 series advantage. In Game 4, the Celtics led by as much as 18 in the third quarter. Facing the prospect of trailing 1–3 in the series, the Sixers came back to take the game from the Celtics and tie the series going back to Boston. Game 5 saw Brandon Bass score 27 points, including 18 in the third quarter as the Celtics blew out the Sixers, 101–85, to push them a win away from the Eastern Conference Finals. Before the start of Game 6, Allen Iverson presented the game ball, prompting huge cheers from the crowd. It was enough to motivate the Sixers to defeat the Celtics 82–75 to force a Game 7. Jrue Holiday scored 20 points, including two free-throws with 31 seconds to go to put the game away. Game 7 was a tight contest, with the two teams going back-and-forth. Paul Pierce fouled out late in the fourth quarter, but Rondo had his second triple-double of the series, including a fourth quarter that helped the Celtics advance to the Conference Finals to face the Miami Heat.

This series is an important plot point in the 2019 film Uncut Gems, in which Garnett co-stars.

Regular-season series

This was the 20th playoff meeting between these two teams, with the Celtics winning 11 of the first 19 meetings.

Western Conference semifinals
This is the first playoffs that the city of Los Angeles has both teams participating in the Conference Semifinals. The last time the Lakers and Clippers were in the Conference Semifinals was 1974, when the Clippers franchise was the Buffalo Braves. Also, another team based out of Staples Center, the National Hockey League's Los Angeles Kings, participated in the 2012 Stanley Cup playoffs. As a result of these 3 teams sharing one arena, Games 3 and 4 of the Thunder–Lakers and Spurs–Clippers series were played back-to-back on May 18–19 and 19–20 respectively, to avoid scheduling conflicts.

(1) San Antonio Spurs vs. (5) Los Angeles Clippers

The Spurs won their last 14 games coming into this series. They were also well prepared because they were able to sweep their previous opponent, the Utah Jazz. Meanwhile, the Clippers were coming off a tough seven-game series against the Memphis Grizzlies and had to play Game 1 just 2 days after the Game 7 ended. Game 1 was close as the teams were tied coming into the 2nd quarter. However, the Spurs quickly took control in the 2nd and 3rd quarters as they defeated the Clippers, 108–92, and took a 1–0 series lead. Game 2 then saw a Spurs team taking control in the second half to defeat the Clippers and take a 2–0 lead. Going to Los Angeles for a back-to-back Games 3 and 4, the Clippers looked confident to defeat the Spurs, as they quickly took a 40–16 lead with 9:17 to go in the 2nd. However, the Spurs quickly cut the lead to 7 with 36.4 seconds before the half, with the half ending with a 10-point Clipper lead. Then, with the Clippers holding on to a 12-point lead with 9:39 to go in the 3rd, the Spurs unleashed a ferocious 24–0 run to take a 69–57 lead with 2 minutes to go in the 3rd. The Clippers never got closer than seven down the stretch as they watched the Spurs take a commanding 3–0 lead in the series. Game 4 was a close one, with the Clippers leading for much of the fourth quarter before the Spurs took the lead on a Duncan hook shot. Then, in the final moments of the game, Paul made several mistakes, a bad pass and an off-balanced jump shot that missed, that ultimately led to Clippers' demise. Following Parker's free-throw that extended the Spurs' lead to 3, the Clippers had one last chance. However, out of timeouts, the Clippers were forced to take a long inbound pass. Mo Williams managed to catch the ball but was unable to get a shot off as the Spurs completed the sweep of the Clippers. The Spurs became just the fourth team to go 8–0 through the first two rounds of the playoffs.

Regular-season series

This was the first playoff meeting between the Clippers and the Spurs.

(2) Oklahoma City Thunder vs. (3) Los Angeles Lakers

Much like the Spurs-Clippers series, the series featured a team that swept their first round opponents and another team that were coming off a tough seven-game series. As such, the Thunder had the advantage in Game 1. The result was a convincing 29-point blowout by the Thunder to the Lakers. The Thunder quickly took control through the first three quarters and stretched their lead to as high as 35. Game 2 was much closer, with the Lakers shocking the Thunder by leading by 7 with 2 minutes to go that would seemingly tie the series at 1. However, the Lakers would fail to keep the lead, with the Thunder eventually going on a 9–0 run to take a 2–0 series lead. In Game 3, the Lakers collaborated on both ends to prevent the Thunder from taking a 3–0 lead putting them back into the series. Game 4 saw the Lakers start strong, taking a 10-point lead at halftime. They were able to have a 13-point lead in the fourth. However, Thunder outscored the Lakers 25–9 the rest of the way to take a 3–1 series lead, putting the Lakers into the brink of elimination. With the score tied at 98, Russell Westbrook committed a crucial turnover when he slipped and lost the ball. However, Pau Gasol's pass was taken by Durant, setting up Durant's 3-pointer that gave the Thunder the lead for good. The Lakers still had one last chance to tie but Kobe Bryant's three missed, with Harden hitting two free-throws to effectively seal the deal. In Game 5, Lakers were able to keep the game close throughout the first three quarters before the Thunder closed the series on a flurry, starting with two threes by Kevin Durant. The Lakers were not able to respond as they watched the Thunder take the series, 4–1, to send the Lakers back home for the second straight season in the Conference Semifinals.

Regular-season series

This was the ninth playoff meeting between these two teams, with the Lakers winning six of the first eight meetings.

Conference finals

Eastern Conference finals

(2) Miami Heat vs. (4) Boston Celtics

This series marked the third straight year that the Heat and Celtics faced each other in the playoffs. They faced each other in the Eastern Conference First Round in 2010 (won by the Celtics, 4–1) and in the Eastern Conference Semifinals in 2011 (won by the Heat, 4–1). In addition, LeBron faced the Celtics for the third straight year in the playoffs. The LeBron-led Cavs also faced the Celtics in 2010 only to be defeated 4–2, which led to James' arrival on the Heat.

In Game 1, the Celtics started poorly, scoring only 11 points in the first quarter. The Heat had a 10-point lead after 1. The Celtics were hot in the second, scoring 35 points en route to tying the game at halftime. Behind a big second half, the Heat eventually defeated the Celtics 93–79 to take a 1–0 series lead. 
Game 2 was very different, with the Celtics starting very strong. Midway through the second quarter, a Rondo jumper extended their lead to 15. However, the Heat cut it to 7 at halftime. Miami had another big 3rd quarter. With the Celtics up 71–66 with 4:24 left in the third, a block by Wade on Allen ignited a 15–4 run by the Heat to end the quarter, as they took a 6-point lead heading into the fourth. The fourth quarter was close. With Miami leading 99–96 with 34 seconds left, Allen made a 3 to tie it. It eventually sent the game to OT, with James missing two chances to win the game. Miami eventually won 115–111 to take a 2–0 series lead. Rondo led the Celtics with a career-high 44 points, along with 8 rebounds and 10 assists. There was controversy in regards to the officiating as the Heat shot 18 more free throws, the Celtics committed 33 fouls to the Heat's 18, as well as a play in overtime in a tie game where Rondo was hit in the head by Wade and no foul was called, leading to a fast break dunk for Udonis Haslem. 
In Game 3, the Celtics got strong performances from Rondo, Garnett, and Pierce. LeBron was also hot in the first quarter, scoring 16 points and making 7 of his first 9 shots. However, despite this performance, the second and third quarters were decisive, with the Celtics outscoring the Heat a combined 55–35 in the two quarters as they had an 85–63 lead heading into the fourth. Miami made a comeback, hitting 3's and dunks to cut the lead to 8. However, Boston held on for a 101–91 victory to make it 2–1. 
Game 4 was the same story, with the Celtics hitting several 3's and putting on a lead as big as 18. Miami tried another comeback in the third and fourth quarters. Unlike Game 3, they took the lead. Boston answered back, holding a 3-point lead in the final minute before James hit a 3 to tie it with 36 seconds left. This led to the second overtime game of the series. It was a low-scoring affair in OT, with both teams only making one field goal. With 4:22 left, Pierce fouled out, giving Miami a big chance. However, James fouled out with 1:51 left. The Celtics still held a 2-point lead in the dying seconds, but Wade missed a potential game-winning 3 at the buzzer, giving the Celtics a 93–91 win to tie the series going back to Miami. 
Celtics proceeded to lead the series, 3–2, with a 94–90 win in Game 5. In the game, Bosh returned for the first time since he got injured in Game 1 of the Heat-Pacers series but was not much of a help on the offensive end. He came off the bench in the game and scored 9 points and grabbed 7 rebounds in 14 minutes played. With the Celtics leading by 1 with less than a minute to go, Pierce knocked down a crucial three-pointer that gave the Celtics the lead for good. 
The Heat prevented a celebration from happening in Game 6 with a 98–79 blowout win at Boston to send the series back to Miami for a seventh and deciding game. James had one of his best playoff games, scoring 45 points and getting 15 rebounds, 30 of his 45 came in the first half alone.
In Game 7, the Celtics started strong. In the second quarter, Garnett picked up his third foul, giving the Heat a chance to try and take a lead. However, Bass led a run that pushed the Celtics' lead to 11. The Celtics would still have a 7-point lead at halftime. The third quarter was decisive once again, letting the Heat tie the game going to the fourth quarter, which was even more decisive. With the Celtics leading by 1 with 8 minutes left, James had a dunk that gave the Heat the lead. It was soon followed by Bosh's third three-pointer of the night (a career-high three 3 pointers) that gave the Heat the lead for good. The Celtics never recovered as the Heat booked a return trip to the Finals with a 101–88 Game 7 win in Miami.

Regular-season series

This was the third playoff meeting between these two teams, with each team winning one series apiece.

Western Conference finals

(1) San Antonio Spurs vs. (2) Oklahoma City Thunder

This series would mark only the second time in the last seven years that the top two seeds from the Western Conference faced each other in the Conference Finals. Game 1 would be close, with the Thunder taking a 9-point lead going to the fourth, looking poised to give the Spurs their first loss of the postseason. However, the Spurs took control on both ends in the fourth quarter to stay perfect in the playoffs. In Game 2, the Spurs started strong, at one point in the third quarter taking a 22-point lead. The Thunder would try to climb back in the fourth quarter, eventually cutting the lead to 6 in the fourth quarter. However, the Spurs would answer every run, en route to a 120–111 win over the Thunder and a 2–0 series lead. Manu Ginobili sealed the deal by hitting a three-pointer that extended the Spurs' lead to 10 with about a minute and a half to go. With the win, the Spurs extended their 2012 playoff record to 10–0. This win also marked the Spurs' 20th consecutive win, tied for the 3rd longest winning streak in NBA history. It is also the longest winning streak that was carried from the regular season and into the playoffs. In Game 3, the Spurs were no match for the Thunder. Behind their thunder blue home crowd, the Thunder blew out the Spurs, 102–82, to give them their first 2012 postseason loss. Game 4 was much closer. In the fourth quarter, Kevin Durant scored half of his 36 points as the Thunder tied the series with a 109–103 win over the Spurs. In Game 5, the Thunder started strong, at one point in the second quarter taking a 13-point lead. The Spurs would still come back in the second half. Fueled by two threes from Ginobili, the Spurs took the lead back. However, the Thunder eventually outscored the Spurs 25–12 for the rest of the quarter to take a 9-point lead heading to the fourth quarter. After a Harden 4-point play that gave the Thunder another 13-point lead, things began to unravel as the Spurs staged an 11–0 run through the next 4 minutes to bring them back into the game. Then, with the Thunder holding on for a 103–101 lead with 28 seconds left, Harden came up big by hitting a crucial three-pointer to give the Thunder a 5-point lead. The Spurs would not give up. Following a Ginobili layup shot that cut the lead to 3, a fullcourt press by the Spurs forced a Thunder turnover, giving them a chance to tie the game. However, Ginobili missed a  three-pointer that sealed a 3–2 lead for the Thunder. In Game 6, the Spurs dominated early, outscoring the Thunder by 14 in the first quarter and holding a 15-point lead at halftime. Their largest lead of the game was 18. However the Thunder rallied in the 3rd quarter, outscoring the Spurs 32–18. With a few clutch shots by Derek Fisher and James Harden, the Thunder booked a trip to the Finals with a 107–99 comeback win over the Spurs. With the win, the Thunder advanced to the NBA Finals for the first time since moving from Seattle in 2008 and the franchise's first appearance in the NBA Finals since 1996, when the franchise was known as the Seattle SuperSonics.

Regular-season series

This was the fourth playoff meeting between these two teams, with the Spurs winning the first three meetings. All previous meetings took place while the Thunder franchise were still known as the Seattle SuperSonics.

NBA Finals: (W2) Oklahoma City Thunder vs. (E2) Miami Heat

Regular-season series

This was the first playoff meeting between the Heat and the Thunder.

Statistic leaders

* Tied NBA Playoffs Record

References

External links

2012 NBA Playoffs at ESPN

Playoffs
National Basketball Association playoffs
ABS-CBN television specials

fi:NBA-kausi 2011–2012#Pudotuspelit